Memory Lane is a 2012 science-fiction film by American director Shawn Holmes and his directorial debut. The film world-premiered on May 6, 2012 at the Sci-Fi-London film festival in London, England and was funded by Shawn Holmes with a budget of less than $300.

Of the film, Holmes stated that he was inspired to create Memory Lane after his friend Michael Guy Allen returned from a tour of duty in Afghanistan. Filming took place in Martins Ferry, Ohio and Wheeling, West Virginia.

Synopsis
Nick (Michael Guy Allen) is a soldier suffering from PTSD. One day while he is out jogging he meets Kayla (Meg Braden), a suicidal young woman ready to throw herself off a bridge. Nick talks her out of the attempt and the two quickly fall in love. Life seems to be getting better until one day he finds Kayla dead in a bathtub. Heartbroken, he tries to kill himself as well but is resuscitated by friends. Moments before he is resuscitated, Nick experiences a series of visions that lead him to believe that Kayla died because she was murdered, not because she killed herself. He decides that the only way to really know the truth is to travel to the afterlife to see Kayla, which requires him to repeatedly kill himself.

Cast
Michael Guy Allen as Nick Boxer
Meg Braden as Kayla M
Julian Curi as Elliot White
Zac Snyder as Ben Haven
David D'Andrea as Mitch Harper
Marianna Alacchi as The Jewelry Lady

Reception
Critical reception has been positive. The Hollywood News noted that "the film isn't without its faults, but they are ones inherent in low-budget filmmaking. Ain't It Cool News stated that "the concept for "Memory Lane" is a winner."

In contrast, DVD Talk wrote "The story was more of a hook and less of a continuous attention-grabber."

Awards and nominations

References

External links
 
 

Films shot in Ohio
2012 films
Films shot in West Virginia
American science fiction films
2012 science fiction films
Films about the afterlife
Films about post-traumatic stress disorder
2012 directorial debut films
2010s English-language films
2010s American films